The Esperanto was a fishing schooner based in Gloucester, Massachusetts.

Esperanto was designed by Thomas F. McManus of Boston and built by James and Tarr Shipbuilders of Essex, Massachusetts.

The Esperanto was used in several races and is one of only two undefeated champions at the International Fisherman's Cup.

International Fisherman's Cup, 1920
Under command of Captain Martin Leander Welch, Esperanto became the first winner of the International Fisherman's Cup on November 1, 1920, when she beat the Canadian fishing schooner Delawana of Riverport under command of Capt. Thomas Himmelman. In the next race, in 1921, the Canadian sailing ship Bluenose, built in Lunenburg after the model of Esperanto, won against the schooner Elsie from Gloucester, Massachusetts.

Her crew for the 1920 race included:
 Captain Martin Leander Welch
 R. Russell Smith, Gorton-Pew Fisheries Co.
 Isaiah Gosbee, Cook
 George E. Roberts
 Harry P. Christianson
 George Young
 Benjamin W. Stanley
 Roy P. Patten
 Raymond "Rusty" McKenzie
 James McDonald
 Wallace Bruce
 John Batt
 John F. Barrett
 Thomas Smith
 Michael J. Hall, Masthead man
 Stephen F. Whitney
 Hugh Young
 Benjamin H. Colby
 James B. Connolly, Writer
 John J. Matheson, Mate
 Thomas S. Benham
 Leon G. Murray
 Lawrence F. Percival
 Ernest Hendrie
 Robert W. Sawtell
 Morril Wiggins

Sinking

On May 30, 1921, Esperanto struck a submerged wreck near Sable Island and sank. The crew was rescued.

References

External links
Schooner Esperanto
Esperanto Photo
"The Fisherman's Race", October 1930, Popular Mechanics

Schooners of the United States
Ships built in Essex, Massachusetts
Shipwrecks of the Nova Scotia coast
Maritime incidents in 1921
1906 ships
Tall ships of the United States